PRMV may refer to :
 Peach rosette mosaic virus, a plant pathogenic virus of the family Comoviridae

PrMV may refer to :
 Primula mosaic virus, a plant pathogenic virus of the family Potyviridae